Augrabies Falls National Park is a national park located around the Augrabies Falls, about 120 km west of Upington in the Northern Cape Province, South Africa. It was established in 1966.

The Augrabies Falls National Park covers an area of 820 km² and stretches along the Orange River. The area is very arid. The waterfall is about 60 metres high and is awe-inspiring when the river is in flood. The gorge below the falls averages about 240 m deep and runs for 18 kilometres. The gorge provides an impressive example of erosion into a granitic basement.

Original Inhabitants
The original Khoekhoe people named the waterfall Ankoerebis, meaning the "place of big noises". The Khoi and San communities within the greater national park inhabit domed huts called ‘matjiehuise’ (mat houses). The huts are ideal for both hot and cold climates. During hot temperatures the tree stems from which the mats are created shrink, which allows gaps to appear – creating a cooling ventilation system. The inverse occurs during cold climates, as the stems expand to keep the cold out. The Trekboers who later settled in the area derived the name Augrabies. The name is sometimes spelt Aughrabies. There are many deposits of alluvial diamonds along the Orange River and legend has it that the biggest cache of diamonds in the world lies in the swirl-hole eroded into the granite at the foot of the waterfall by the thundering waters.

Animal and Plant Life
The most characteristic plant in the park is the giant tree aloe (Aloidendron dichotomum) known locally as the quiver tree or kokerboom. It is perfectly adapted to the dry semi-desert rocky areas found in the Nama-Karoo, able to withstand the extreme temperatures and the infertile soil. This tree, which grows up to five metres high, gets its name from the fact that the Bushmen (San) used the soft branches to make quivers for their arrows. The eye-catching silhouette of the quiver tree is typical of this part of Northern Cape landscape. When the tree flowers in the winter flocks of birds are attracted to their copious nectar, and baboons can be seen tearing the flowers apart to get the sweet liquor. The Shepherd's tree, a stocky tree that grows in typically dry, open woodland and bushveld, can be found in the area. The Khoi and San communities around these areas hold this tree in deep reverence; its destruction is strictly forbidden. This tree also grows in part of the Free State province.

There is an array of animal species on the 28 000 hectares of the Augrabies National Park. Game such as springbok, gemsbok and the endangered south-central black rhinoceros can be found here. Rare animals such as the Cape clawless otter can be spotted in the area, alongside the black-backed jackal, caracal, the bat-eared fox and the African wildcat. The Water Monitor, Africa's largest lizard, can be found along the water. The Doublebanded Sandgrouse can be found here, alongside the more commonly spotted Namaqua Sandgrouse. These are found in freshwater systems, lagoons, and the sea so long as fresh drinking water is available.

Activities
Apart from the Augrabies Falls, key activities in the park include night drives during peak season; the Gariep trail and the Klipspringer 3 day trail hike. The Augrabies National Park is approximately an 8 hours drive from Cape Town, and 10 hours from Johannesburg.

Weather
Rainy season occurs mainly between the months of January to April.

See also
 Broadley's Flat Lizard
 South African National Parks
 Yosemite National Park

References

External links

 Official website

Orange River
Protected areas established in 1966
Kalahari Desert
National parks of South Africa
Protected areas of the Northern Cape